Homeless Jesus, also known as Jesus the Homeless, is a bronze sculpture by Canadian sculptor Timothy Schmalz depicting Jesus as a homeless person, sleeping on a park bench. The original sculpture was installed at Regis College, University of Toronto, in early 2013. Over 100 casts of the statue have been installed worldwide since 2016.

Description and history

Homeless Jesus was designed by Timothy Schmalz, a Canadian sculptor and devout Catholic. It depicts Jesus as a homeless person, sleeping on a park bench. His face and hands are obscured, hidden under a blanket, but crucifixion wounds on his feet reveal his identity. The statue has been described as a "visual translation" of the Gospel of Matthew passage in which Jesus tells his disciples, "as you did it to one of the least of my brothers, you did it to me". Schmalz intended for the bronze sculpture to be provocative, admitting, "That's essentially what the sculpture is there to do. It's meant to challenge people." He offered the first casts to St. Michael's Cathedral in Toronto and St. Patrick's Cathedral in New York, but both churches declined. One spokesperson for St. Michael's said the church declined because appreciation "was not unanimous" and it was undergoing restoration. The cast intended for St. Michael's was installed at Regis College, the Jesuit School of Theology at the University of Toronto. Similarly, a spokesperson for St. Patrick's complimented the work but declined purchasing the cast due to ongoing renovations.

Installations in other countries followed.  For example, the first location in the United States was located at St. Alban's Episcopal Church in Davidson, North Carolina. It was purchased for $22,000 and displayed as a memorial to parishioner Kate McIntyre, who had an affinity for public art. According to the Rev. David Buck, rector of St. Alban's, "It gives authenticity to our church. This is a relatively affluent church, to be honest, and we need to be reminded ourselves that our faith expresses itself in active concern for the marginalized of society". Buck welcomed discussion about the sculpture and considers it a "Bible lesson for those used to seeing Jesus depicted in traditional religious art as the Christ of glory, enthroned in finery." Furthermore, he said in an interview with NPR, "We believe that that's the kind of life Jesus had. He was, in essence, a homeless person."

For the downtown Detroit location, Rev. Gary Wright, S.J. of the Saints Peter and Paul Jesuit Church has said Homeless Jesus honors and may comfort the homeless people whom the church serves.  An anonymous alumnus of the Jesuit- and Sisters of Mercy-sponsored University of Detroit Mercy School of Law, which adjoins Saints Peter and Paul, donated funds for the statue at the church, placing it just across East Jefferson Avenue from Detroit's iconic Renaissance Center towers.

Charleston, West Virginia, received the 8th Homeless Jesus statue in November, 2014.

A cast has been installed on the Via della Conziliazione, the street leading to St. Peter's Basilica outside of the Papal Office of Charities in March 2016. Earlier, Schmalz visited the Pope in Vatican City in November 2013 to present a miniature version of his statue. He recalled about the Pope's reaction, "He walked over to the sculpture, and it was just chilling because he touched the knee of the Jesus the Homeless sculpture, and closed his eyes and prayed. It was like, that's what he's doing throughout the whole world: Pope Francis is reaching out to the marginalized." Catholic Charities of Chicago and the Archdiocese of Washington, D.C. have both had casts installed outside of their offices. Pope Francis visited the sculpture installed along G Street in Chinatown, Washington, D.C., during his 2015 visit to the United States.

St. Paul's Cathedral, Buffalo, New York, is now the permanent site for Homeless Jesus, installed during Holy Week 2015. St. Paul's, the Cathedral for The Episcopal Diocese of Western New York, is located at 139 Church Street (corner of Church and Pearl in downtown Buffalo).

In May 2016, a cast was installed at the new main services building of Catholic Charities of the Archdiocese of Oklahoma City along Classen Boulevard in Oklahoma City, Oklahoma. An estimated 60,000 vehicles pass the sculpture daily at this location. In August 2017, a cast was installed at the front entrance of Father Woody's Haven of Hope in Denver, Colorado, at the corner of 7th and Lipan Streets. Father Woody's Haven of Hope mission is to provide food, shelter, clothing, counseling, rehabilitation and hygienic services to the homeless and less fortunate.

Manchester has recently approved an installation outside St Ann's Church. The statue was originally going to be installed in Westminster outside of the Methodist Church's Westminster Central Hall but was eventually rejected. The city believed that the statue would not properly reflect the nature. The Bishop of Manchester reflected on the importance of having Homeless Jesus. He remembered Jesus saying that turning away from helping someone in need is like turning from Jesus.

On Dec. 7th, 2017, a cast of the statue was installed in Nelson Mandela Place, Glasgow, Scotland. Scottish artist Peter Howson has made a painting of a homeless Jesus that will be shown alongside the statue. Glasgow priest Father Willy Slavin helped bring the sculpture to Scotland. He was contacted by Schmalz in 2015, and took the idea to the Glasgow Churches Together association.

In April 2019 a statue was installed in the Gardens of Church of Our Lady and Saint Nicholas, Liverpool. It was unveiled by residents of Liverpool YMCA and blessed by the Bishop of Liverpool. The unveiling took place in the context of a Homelessness Conference organized by the Parish Church and Crispin Pailing and drawing together politicians with public, private and charitable sectors to address issues of homelessness in the city.

In November 2019, a cast was installed in front of the St. James United Church in Montreal, Quebec, ahead of the observance of the second World Day of the Poor. St. James' Church, Sydney participated in the international vigil for the poor and homeless on 17 November 2019 at its Homeless Jesus sculpture installed outside the church with a service followed by a free lunch for the homeless in the church's crypt.

In April 2022, the image was installed at the Manila Cathedral in Intramuros, Manila. It was unveiled and blessed by Manila Archbishop Cardinal Jose Advincula on April 10, 2022, coinciding with Palm Sunday.

Reception
Reception of the statue has been mixed. According to NPR, "The reaction [to the cast in Davidson, North Carolina] was immediate. Some loved it; some didn't." Some Davidson residents felt it was an "insulting depiction" of Jesus that "demeaned" the neighborhood. One Davidson resident called police the first time she saw it, mistaking the statue for a real homeless person. Another neighbor wrote a letter, saying it "[creeped] him out". However, according to Buck, residents are often seen sitting on the bench alongside the statue, resting their hands on Jesus and praying.

In October 2020, a resident of Bay Village, Ohio called the police to report a homeless person sleeping on a park bench. This call was made within 20 minutes of the Homeless Jesus sculpture being installed at St. Barnabas Episcopal Church, in Bay Village. This made national news due to reporters calling out the city's residents for being privileged and ignoring the concerns of the homeless.

Copies
By early 2016, some 100 copies of Homeless Jesus were on display worldwide. The first sculpture outside of North America was installed on the grounds of Christ Church Cathedral, Dublin.

The following list shows some places where copies of the sculpture have been installed.

Americas

In front of the United Methodist Church in Charleston, West Virginia, USA
At Calvary Episcopal Church in Cincinnati, Ohio, USA
At St. Paul's Episcopal Cathedral in Buffalo, NY, USA
At St. Alban's Episcopal Church in Davidson, North Carolina, USA
Outside of St. Basil's hall at St. Mary's University in Calgary, Canada
 Outside the Catholic Charities of the Archdiocese of Chicago 's headquarters in the River North neighbourhood of Chicago , USA
Central Presbyterian Church in Austin, Texas, USA
 In front of Saints Peter and Paul Jesuit Catholic Church in downtown Detroit , USA
 At Valparaiso University in Valparaiso, Indiana , USA
 Behind Roberts Park Methodist Episcopal Church in downtown Indianapolis, Indiana , USA
 In front of Catholic Charities of the Archdiocese of Oklahoma City's main services building, Oklahoma, USA
 On the corner of the grounds at St. Ann's Catholic Parish in Coppell, Texas, USA
 On the corner of Mockingbird Ln and Elmbrook Rd in Dallas, Texas, USA
 In front of Holy Rosary Cathedral in Vancouver , British Columbia , Canada
Outside Our Lady of Wisdom Newman Center, Nevada, USA
Outside Mexico City Metropolitan Cathedral, Mexico
Trinity Episcopal Church in Toledo, Ohio, USA
Outside St James United Church, Montreal, Canada
At St Johns Hospice, Philadelphia, Pennsylvania, USA
At St John the Divine Cathedral, New York, USA
At Epiphany Cathedral, Venice, Florida USA
In the Metropolitan Cathedral in Buenos Aires, Argentina
In the Monserrate cathedral in Bogota, Colombia
 Dominican Order Convent at Santo Domingo's Ciudad Colonial, Dominican Republic.
 Installed outside the Josephinum (home of Christ Our Hope Parish), Belltown, Seattle, Washington
 St. Patrick Catholic Church, Hamilton, ON

Asia

On the grounds of the Church of Saint Peter in ancient Capernaum, Israel
 On the Sea of Galilee, Israel
At Cathedral of the Good Shepherd, Singapore
 In Seosomun Historical Park, a park dedicated to the memory of Christian martyrs in Seoul, South Korea

Europe

Outside St George's Tron Church, Glasgow, Scotland, UK
Near Almundena Cathedral of Madrid, Madrid, Spain
At King's University College, London, UK
At Salvation Army, Belfast, Northern Ireland, UK.
Church of the Immaculate Conception, Farm Street, London, UK
At Christ Church Cathedral, Dublin, Ireland
At Holy Magdalena Church, Bruges, Belgium
At Sant' Egidio, Antwerp, Belgium
In St Anne's Square, Manchester, UK
At Sant'Egidio Headquarters, Rome, Italy
In St. Biagio Church, Codogno, Italy
In the Gardens of the Church of Our Lady and Saint Nicholas, Liverpool
Outside Centenary House, Dunbar Link, Belfast, Northern Ireland
At the Papal Office of Charities, Rome, Italy

Oceania
Outside St James' Church, Sydney, Australia
At Newman College, Melbourne, Australia
Outside Sacred Heart Cathedral, Townsville, Australia

See also
 Depiction of Jesus
 Homelessness in popular culture
 List of statues of Jesus

Notes

References

External links 

 The Homeless Jesus in the Gospel of Matthew by Robert Myles (2014)

2013 establishments in Canada
2013 sculptures
Belltown, Seattle
Bronze sculptures in Canada
Bronze sculptures in Michigan
Bronze sculptures in North Carolina
Bronze sculptures in Washington, D.C.
Homelessness in popular culture
Monuments and memorials in Detroit
Monuments and memorials in Ireland
Monuments and memorials in North Carolina
Monuments and memorials in Seattle
Monuments and memorials in Toronto
Monuments and memorials in Washington, D.C.
Outdoor sculptures in Canada
Outdoor sculptures in Indiana
Outdoor sculptures in Ireland
Outdoor sculptures in Michigan
Outdoor sculptures in Oklahoma
Outdoor sculptures in Seattle
Outdoor sculptures in Washington, D.C.
Sculpture series
Sculptures of men in Canada
Sculptures of men in Indiana
Sculptures of men in Michigan
Sculptures of men in North Carolina
Sculptures of men in Texas
Sculptures of men in Washington (state)
Sculptures of men in Washington, D.C.
Statues in Canada
Statues in Indiana
Statues in Ireland
Statues in Michigan
Statues in North Carolina
Statues in Texas
Statues in Washington (state)
Statues in Washington, D.C.
Statues of Jesus
University of Toronto
Works by Canadian people